The Ordway Prize, created in 2005, is awarded every other year to two recipients, one artist and one curator/arts writer who have had significant impact on the field of contemporary art. Since 2008, the prize has been administered by the New Museum in New York in conjunction with Creative Link for the Arts. It carries with it an unrestricted cash award of $100,000. The nominees are between the ages of forty and sixty-five, and must have a developed body of work extending over a minimum of fifteen years. The winners are chosen by a jury composed of arts professionals.

About Creative Link

"Creative Link for the Arts is a privately funded nonprofit organization dedicated to facilitating partnership in philanthropy and forging innovative relationships between art institutions, nonprofits, corporations, and philanthropists interested in supporting the arts and creating a cultural legacy."

History of the Prize 

2005 Winners

 Doris Salcedo, Artist
 Ralph Rugoff, Curator

2008 Winners

 James Elaine, Curator/Arts Writer
 Cildo Meireles, Artist

2010 Nominees

Tania Bruguera, Artist
William Pope.L, Artist
Artur Żmijewski, Artist
 Sabine Breitwieser, Curator/Arts Writer
Hou Hanru, Curator/Arts Writer
 Hamza Walker, Curator/Arts Writer

2010 Winners

 Hamza Walker, Curator/Arts Writer
 Artur Zmijewski, Artist

References

External links 
 Absolute Arts

Visual arts awards